Hemerophila musicosema is a moth in the family Choreutidae. It was described by Edward Meyrick in 1926. It is found in Bolivia.

References

Choreutidae
Moths described in 1926